Forkhead box protein J1 is a protein that in humans is encoded by the FOXJ1 gene. It is a member of the Forkhead/winged helix (FOX) family of transcription factors that is involved in ciliogenesis. FOXJ1 is expressed in ciliated cells of the lung, choroid plexus, reproductive tract, embryonic kidney and pre-somite embryo stage.

Gene Location 
The human FOXJ1 gene is located on the long arm of chromosome 17, region 2, band 5, sub-band 1.

Structure 
FOXJ1 has a conserved 100 amino acid long DNA binding domain.

Function 

This gene encodes a member of the forkhead family of transcription factors. Similar genes in zebrafish and mouse have been shown to regulate the transcription of genes that control the production of motile cilia. The mouse ortholog also functions in the determination of left-right asymmetry.

Ciliogenesis 

Primary ciliogenesis is FOXJ1 dependent and this transcription factor is required for motile ciliated cell differentiation. The onset of FOXJ1 expression is indicative of cells fated to become motile cilliated cells. Cells commit towards ciliogenesis prior to FOXJ1 activation. Activation promotes basal body trafficking, docking at the apical membrane and subsequent axoneme growth. The protein p73 a member of the p53 protein family directly regulates FOXJ1 and is a requirement for ciliated cell formation. The 10,000bp long transcription start site of FOXJ1 features three sequence specific binding sites for p73.

Immune system 

In mammalian cells, FOXJ1 has been shown to suppress NFκB, a key regulator in the immune response and also inhibits the humoral response in B-cells. This occurs via regulation of an inhibitory component of NFκB called IκBβ and IL-6.

Development 

FOXJ1 is expressed at various points during embryonic development in relation to teeth germination, enamel, oral and tongue epithelium formation, and formation of sub-mandibular salivary glands and hair follicles. Absence of FOXJ1 expression decreases calpastatin, an inhibitor of the protease calpain. Calpain dysregulation affects basal body anchoring to the apical cytoskeleton affecting axeonemal formation. Expression of FOXJ1 is inhibited by IL-13.

Clinical significance 

Polymorphisms in this gene are associated with systemic lupus erythematosus and allergic rhinitis.

Viral infections of the respiratory system have been found to lower the expression of FOXJ1. This affects ciliogenesis and impacts mucocillary action.

Breast cancer 
Studies into human breast tissue lines and primary breast tumors have observed that the gene FOXJ1 are aberrantly hypermethylated in primary tumors. This hypermethylation serves to silence production of the FOXJ1 protein and has been proposed as a potentially important event in tumor formation.

Clear renal cell carcinoma 
FOXJ1 expression has been shown to be elevated in clear cell renal carcinoma patients and indicative of tumor stage, histological grade and tumor size. High expression of FOXJ1 in CRCC patients was associated with poor prognosis. There is potential for FOXJ1 to act as an oncogene marker for CRCC patients and has value as a therapeutic target.

Axenfeld–Rieger syndrome 
Axenfeld–Rieger syndrome patients have a point mutation in PITX2 a regulatory protein of the FOXJ1 gene. PITX2 alongside LEF-1 and β-Catenin regulate FOXJ1. FOXJ1 in turn interacts with PITX2 to form a positive feedback mechanism. In the PITX2 point mutant whilst able to bind with FOXJ1 lacks the ability to activate the FOXJ1 promoter, this results in improper oro-facial morphogenesis a factor in ARS.

Hydrocephalus 

Mutations in this gene have been associated with an autosomal dominant syndrome that includes hydrocephalus and randomization of left/right body asymmetry.

References

Further reading 

 
 
 
 
 
 
 
 
 

Forkhead transcription factors